Giovanni Dozzini (born 1978) is an Italian writer and journalist. He was born and raised in Perugia. He won the EU Prize for Literature in 2019 for his book E Baboucar guidava la fila.

References

Writers from Umbria
1978 births
Living people
People from Perugia